is a railway station on the Ōito Line in the city of Ōmachi, Nagano Prefecture, Japan, operated by East Japan Railway Company (JR East).

Lines
Shinano-Tokiwa Station is served by the Ōito Line and is 30.9 kilometers from the starting point of the line at Matsumoto Station.

Station layout
The station consists of two ground-level side platforms connected by a level crossing. The station is unattended.

Platforms

History
It was renamed Shinano-Tokiwa on 1 June 1937. With the privatization of Japanese National Railways (JNR) on 1 April 1987, the station came under the control of JR East.

Surrounding area
Takase River

Omachi Minami Elementary School

See also
List of railway stations in Japan

References

External links
 JR East station information 

Railway stations in Nagano Prefecture
Ōito Line
Railway stations in Japan opened in 1915
Stations of East Japan Railway Company
Ōmachi, Nagano